Basha High School is a public high school located in Chandler, Arizona and the third high school built by Chandler Unified School District.

History 
Basha High School was named after Eddie Basha, Jr., who made donations in the millions of dollars to the Chandler Unified School District (CUSD) and lived in the community until his death in 2013.  The CUSD school board appointed Marques Reischl, former Basha High School Vice Principal and Athletic Director, as the new principal on July 1, 2020.

Academics 
Basha abides by the standards set by the Arizona Department of Education and implements the state's Education and Career Action Plan (ECAP) required for all students 9-12 grade students to graduate from a public Arizona high school. CUSD high schools also implements an open enrollment policy, meaning students from outside the intended school boundaries may attend without tuition or other penalties.

Arizona requires that all high school students take 6 credit bearing courses during their freshmen through junior years, and have the option of reducing credits to 4 credit bearing courses if they are track for graduation. However, CUSD requires all students must complete 22 credits whereas the public university system controlled by the Arizona Board of Regents requires only 16 credits in the following areas:
 English - 4 credits
 Mathematics - 4 credits
 Science - 3 credits
 Social Studies. - 3 credits
 Career and Technical Education/Fine Arts - 1 credit
 Physical Education - 1 credit
 Comprehensive Health - ½ credits
 Elective Courses - 5 ½ credits

Cross-credit courses 
At all CUSD high schools, students may swap three semesters (½ credits per semester) of Spiritline, Dance, Drill Team, Color Guard, Marching Band, Winter guard, or AFJROTC for the Physical Education credit required for graduation.

Students which choose applied sciences in areas such as Applied Biology or Applied Agricultural Sciences gain equivalent Science credits. Likewise, Economics credits can be awarded like Agricultural Business Management, Business, Business Applications, Marketing, Economics Applications, Family and Consumer Sciences, and vocational courses.

Community college credits can be awarded through a partnership with Chandler-Gilbert Community College (CGCC) and cooperative credits for vocational courses are provided by East Valley Institute of Technology (EVIT). Students must be dually enrolled for the Arizona community college or the Arizona public university system to accept the credits towards a degree. CUSD Transportation Department provides routes between Basha, EVIT, and CGCC with after school hours transportation intended for students participating in activities.

Other programs 
Separate from EVIT and CGCC, the University of Arizona implemented a pilot program to get university credits for students pursuing introductory engineering courses starting in 2014. Basha has an Accelerated Middle School Program on campus (AMS). The AMS program has grades 6, 7 and 8. AMS students have access to high school teachers and equipment.

Extracurricular activities

Athletics 
Basha is an Arizona Interscholastic Association (AIA) member school offering boys and girls sports complying with Title IX. Student athletes can participate in varsity, junior varsity, and freshmen only teams as well as individual athletics in:
 Badminton
 Baseball
 Basketball (Boys)
 Basketball (Girls)
 Cheer
 Cross Country
 Football
 Golf (Boys)
 Golf (Girls)
 Hockey Competitive
 Lacrosse (Girls)
 Pomline
 Soccer (Boys)
 Soccer (Girls)
 Softball
 Swim and Dive
 Tennis (Boys)
 Tennis (Girls)
 Track and field
 Volleyball (Boys)
 Volleyball (Girls)
 Wrestling

 Dance

Athletic Championships 
Basha Boys Basketball team won state championship in 2017 |url=https://www.cusd80.com/Domain/470

The Basha girls' softball team has won two state titles (2008, 2009).

Competitive Musical Programs 
The Basha Bear Regiment won their first state championship in Division II in 2009, and the Indoor Percussion Ensemble won eight consecutive state championships from 2007 through 2014 and again in 2019.  The Basha Winter Winds ensemble also won the state championships in their inaugural season of 2019.

Clubs and Other Activities 
Its speech and debate team competes in National Forensic League events.

Campus 
Basha High has a branch of the Chandler Public Library within the school.

Notable alumni
 Allan Bower ('13), artistic gymnast and member of Team USA at the 2020 Tokyo Olympics
 Jamie Westbrook, member of Team USA Baseball at the 2020 Tokyo Olympics

References

External links
Basha High Homepage
School report card from the Arizona Department of Education
Basha High School Band
School overview

Educational institutions established in 2002
Public high schools in Arizona
Schools in Maricopa County, Arizona
Education in Chandler, Arizona
2002 establishments in Arizona
Buildings and structures in Chandler, Arizona